Browntown, Pennsylvania may refer to a community in the United States:

Browntown, Bradford County, Pennsylvania, an unincorporated community
Browntown, Luzerne County, Pennsylvania, a census-designated place